Miguel Gutiérrez (born 3 September 1954) is a Spanish racing cyclist. He rode in the 1979 Tour de France.

References

External links
 

1954 births
Living people
Spanish male cyclists
Place of birth missing (living people)
Cyclists from Madrid